Autostrada A51, also called tangenziale Est di Milano, is a motorway tangent to the city and suburban area of Milan in its eastern part, managed by Milano Serravalle – Milano Tangenziali.

Together with the A50 (tangenziale Ovest di Milano), the A52 (tangenziale Nord di Milano) and the Autostrada A58 (Tangenziale Est Esterna di Milano), it makes up the largest Italian ring road system around a city, for a total length of 106 km. By adding the urban sections of A1 and A4, which runs parallel to the Tangenziale Nord by connecting A51, A50 and A58, to the four ring roads, a system of urban highways that totally surrounds the city. The traffic flow that affects this stretch of motorway is over 170,000 daily transits.

References

Sports venues completed in 1973
1973 establishments in Italy
A51
Transport in Milan
Ring roads in Italy